Dan Whelchel (August 26, 1894 – March 1, 1988)  was a college football player and fruit horticulturalist.

Early years
Dan Whelchel was born in Dawson County, Georgia on August 26, 1894 to Jordan Davis Whelchel and Amanda Jane Palmour. At the time of his enrollment at Tech he was living in Ashburn, Georgia. Dan was a first cousin of All-Southern Georgia Bulldogs football player Hugh Whelchel.

Georgia Tech
Whelchel was a prominent guard for John Heisman's Georgia Tech Golden Tornado of the Georgia Institute of Technology.

1917
He was a member of the school's first national championship team in 1917, having to join the American effort in the First World War before he got to celebrate.

Horticulturalist
Whelchel later was a fruit horticulturalist in Arkansas, specializing in nuts.

References

1894 births
1988 deaths
American football guards
Georgia Tech Yellow Jackets football players
Players of American football from Georgia (U.S. state)
People from Turner County, Georgia
American horticulturists